Defending champion Dylan Alcott defeated David Wagner in the final, 6–2, 6–2 to win the quad singles wheelchair tennis title at the 2016 Australian Open.

Draw

Final

Round robin
Standings are determined by: 1. number of wins; 2. number of matches; 3. in two-players-ties, head-to-head records; 4. in three-players-ties, percentage of sets won, or of games won; 5. steering-committee decision.

References
 Draw

Wheelchair Quad Singles
2016 Quad Singles